The International Uranium Film Festival was founded in 2010 in Rio de Janeiro, and has traveled to Germany, Portugal, India and the United States. This educational event merges art, ecology, environmentalism and environmental justice, to inform the public about uranium mining and milling, nuclear power issues, nuclear weapons and the nuclear fuel cycle from "cradle to grave" life-cycle assessment - and the effects of radioactivity on humans and other species. The festival founders and principal organizers are Norbert Suchanek and Marcia Gomes de Oliveira. The legal organizer of the International Uranium Film Festival is the arts and education non-profit "Yellow Archives". The organizers and the festival participants seek to educate and activate the international public on these issues through the dynamic media of film and video.

Film themes

The films shown typically have content that critiques and analyzes uranium mining, milling, and use, and the effects there of on land, water and human health. A key objective of the festival is to inform cultures and future generations about the effects of radioactivity and radioactive materials. Public education and open discussion of these matters may lead to a more peaceful, healthy future, and hold promise to promote a safe, sustainable future without nuclear risks. The Atomic Age nuclear world has produced millions of metric tons of high-level, low-level and intermediate-level radioactive waste during the past sixty years.  This waste will remain hazardous for over 100,000 years. Other themes explore atomic legacy issues, including the research, development, testing and use of nuclear weapons.  Many of these events affected specific populations including the Marshall Islanders, Native American cultures in the U.S. Southwest and Northwest, First Nations in Western Canada, among others.

Films on nuclear issues
 Abita. Children from Fukushima, Directors: Shoko Hara and Paul Brenner, Germany, 2012, 4 min, English subtitles, animation
 Atomic Bombs on the Planet Earth, Director: Peter Greenaway, UK/The Netherlands, 2011, 13 minutes
 Atomic Footprints, Director: Pip Starr, Australia, 2007, 14 min, English
 Atomic Ivan, Director: Vasily Barkhatov, Russia, 2012, 91 min, English subtitles
 Buddha Weaps in Jadugoda, Director: Shriprakash Prakash, India, 1999, 55 min
 Cesium in my Blood, Director: Lars Westman, Sweden/Brazil, 2009, 70 min
 Children of Uranium, Director: Adina Popescu, Romania, 2009, 64 min, English subtitles
 Enola, Director: Christoph Boekel, Germany, 1986, 28 min, English subtitles
 Forbidden Ground Fukushima, Director: Kazunori Kurimoto, Japan, 2012, 57 min
 Hibakusha, Director: Steve Nguyen & Choz Belen, USA, 2012, 54 min, English, with animation
 High Power, Director: Pradeep Indulkar, India, 2013, 27 min, English subtitles
 Hiroshima Nagasaki Download, Director: Shinpei Takeda, Mexico/Japan, 2010, 73 min, Japanese/English
 Iraq: Fallujah's Sacrificed Children, Director: Feurat Alani, France 2011, 48 min, French
 Nuclear Savage: The Islands of Secret Project 4.1, Director: Adam Jonas Horowitz, USA, 2012, 87 min
 Nuclear Waste, Director: Myroslav Slaboshpytskiy, Ukraine, 2012, 25 min, English subtitles
 Slouching Towards Yucca Mountain, Director: Eve Andree Laramee, USA, 2011, 17 min, English subtitles
 The Atomic States of America, Directors: Don Argott & Sheena M. Joyce, USA, 2011, 92 min, English
 The Four Corners: A National Sacrifice Area?, Director: Christopher McLeod, USA, 1983, 58 min, English
 The Return of the Navajo Boy Epilogue, Director: Jeff Spitz, USA, 2008, 15 min
 The Ultimate Wish: Ending the Nuclear Age, Director: Robert Richter, USA, 2012,40 min, English subtitles 
 U 4 Uranium?, Director: Shanny Haziza, Israel, 2012, 54 min, English subtitles
 Under Control, Director: Volker Sattel, Germany, 2011, 98 min, English subtitles
 Uranium - To Die For, Director: Shanny Haziza, Israel, 2012, 54 min, English subtitles

Organizers
The legal organizer of the International Uranium Film Festival is the arts and education non-profit "Yellow Archives".  This charitable organization is registered in Rio de Janeiro and officially recognized by the Brazilian Government. Partners of the festival are the Heinrich Boell Foundation  Brazil, Rio de Janeiro's Museum of Modern Art MAM-Rio  and the Technical State School for TV, Cinema, Tourism and Events - Adolpho Bloch of the Foundation for Education and Science FAETEC.

See also
Hibakusha
History of the anti-nuclear movement
List of films about nuclear issues
List of Nuclear-Free Future Award recipients
The Navajo People and Uranium Mining
The Return of Navajo Boy
Uranium in the environment
Uranium mining debate
World Uranium Hearing

References

Uranium
Environmental art
Environmental film festivals
Anti-nuclear movement
Uranium mining